Anthroposophic medicine (or anthroposophical medicine) is a form of alternative medicine based on pseudoscientific and occult notions. Devised in the 1920s by Rudolf Steiner (1861–1925) in conjunction with Ita Wegman (1876–1943), anthroposophical medicine draws on Steiner's spiritual philosophy, which he called anthroposophy. Practitioners employ a variety of treatment techniques based upon anthroposophic precepts, including massage, exercise, counselling, and substances.

Many drug preparations used in anthroposophic medicine are ultra-diluted substances, similar to those used in homeopathy. Homeopathic remedies are not medically effective and are generally considered harmless, except when used as a substitute for a scientifically proven and effective prevention and cure. In certain European countries, people with cancer are sometimes prescribed remedies made from specially harvested mistletoe, although no evidence of clinical benefit exists. Some anthroposophic doctors oppose childhood vaccination, and this has led to preventable outbreaks of disease.

Anthroposophic medicine departs from fundamental biological, physical and chemical principles in several respects. For example, Steiner said that the heart is not a pump, but that the blood in a sense pumps itself. Anthroposophic medicine also proposes that patients' past lives may influence their illness and that the course of an illness is subject to karmic destiny. Professor of complementary medicine Edzard Ernst and other physicians and scientists including Simon Singh and David Gorski have characterized anthroposophic medicine as pseudoscientific quackery, with no basis in reason or logic.

Background

History

The first steps towards an anthroposophic approach to medicine were made before 1920, when homeopathic physicians and pharmacists began working with Rudolf Steiner, who recommended new medicinal substances as well as specific methods for preparation along with an anthroposophic concept of man. In 1921, Ita Wegman opened the first anthroposophic medical clinic, now known as the Klinik Arlesheim, in Arlesheim, Switzerland. Wegman was soon joined by a number of other doctors. They then began to train the first anthroposophic nurses for the clinic.

At Wegman's request, Steiner regularly visited the clinic and suggested treatment regimes for particular patients. Between 1920 and 1925, he also gave several series of lectures on medicine. In 1925, Wegman and Steiner wrote the first book on the anthroposophic approach to medicine, Fundamentals of Therapy.

Wegman later opened a separate clinic and curative home in Ascona. Wegman lectured widely, visiting the Netherlands and England particularly frequently, and an increasing number of doctors began to include the anthroposophic approach in their practices. A cancer clinic, the Lukas Clinic, opened in Arlesheim in 1963.

In 1976 anthroposophic medicine in Germany got regulated by law as a specific therapeutic system ("Besondere Therapierichtung") by the Medicines Act-Arzneimittelgesetz (AMG) and by the Code of Social Law (Sozialgesetzbuch V)

In the 1990s the Witten/Herdecke University in Germany established a chair in anthroposophical medicine. The press described the appointment as a "death sentence" and the perception that pseudoscience was being taught damaged the university's reputation, bringing it close to financial collapse. It was ultimately saved by a cash injection from Software AG, a technology corporation with a history of funding anthroposophic projects.

In 2012 the University of Aberdeen considered establishing a chair in holistic health jointly funded by Software AG, and by the Anthroposophic Health, Education, and Social Care Movement, each of which would provide £1.5 million of endowment. Edzard Ernst commented "that any decent university should even consider an anthroposophical medicine unit seems incomprehensible. The fact that it would be backed by people who have a financial interest in this bogus approach makes it even worse." The University's governance and nominations committee eventually decided not to proceed with the appointment.

Categorization and conceptual basis
The categorization of anthroposophical medicine is complex since in part it complements conventional medicine, and in part it substitutes for it. In 2008, Ernst wrote that it was being promoted as an "extension to conventional medicine".

Ernst writes that Steiner used imagination and insight as a basis for his ideas, drawing mystical knowledge from the occult Akashic Records, a work which is supposedly situated on the astral plane, and which Steiner said was accessible to him via his intuitive powers. On this basis, Steiner proposed "associations between four postulated dimensions of the human body (physical body, etheric body, astral body, and ego), plants, minerals, and the cosmos". Steiner also proposed a connection betweens planets, metals and organs so that, for example, the planet Mercury, the element mercury and the lung were all somehow associated. These propositions form the basis of anthroposophical medicine.

Ernst has said that anthroposophical medicine "includes some of the least plausible theories one could possibly imagine", categorized it as "pure quackery", and said that it "has no basis in science". According to Quackwatch, anthroposophical medicine practitioners regard illness as a "rite of passage" necessary to purge spiritual impurities carried over from past lives, according to the precepts of "karmic destiny".

Methods

In anthroposophic pharmacy, drugs are prepared according to ancient notions of alchemy and homeopathy which are not related to the science underlying modern pharmacology. During the preparation process, patterns formed by crystallization are interpreted to see which "etheric force" they most closely resemble. Most anthroposophic preparations are highly diluted, like homeopathic remedies. This means that, while they are completely harmless in themselves, using them in place of conventional medicine to treat serious illness carries a risk of severe adverse consequences.

As well as drug remedies, anthroposophical medicine also includes:

 Anthroposophic nursing
 Counselling
 Eurythmy – claimed to have an effect on "inner life functions" leading to a "re-integration of body, soul, and spirit".
 External applications
 Rhythmic massages

Plant-derived treatments
To select an anthroposophic substance for a particular illness, practitioners consider the source of the substances used. The character of a mineral, plant or animal is hypothesised to have been formed by the substances that are most active within it, in the belief that this character may also influence what the substance will accomplish when given to treat another organism. This is related to Samuel Hahnemann's Doctrine of signatures. Willow, for example, is considered to have an unusual character:

There is no scientific evidence that the shape of plants has ever caused a new medical property to be discovered.

Beliefs about human biology
Steiner described the heart not as a pump, but as a regulator of flow, such that the heartbeat itself can be distinguished from the circulation of blood.  Anthroposophic medicine claims the flow in the blood of the circulatory system is, as Marinelli put it, "propelled with its own biological momentum, as can be seen in the embryo, and boosts itself with induced momenta from the heart".

This view of the heart is not based on any scientific theory and has been characterized as "crank science".

Steiner believed that the sex of a baby was determined at the moment of conception by the alignment of the stars.

Steiner's model of anatomy was based on a three-part notion, whereby the head is the thinking part, the abdomen and limbs the "metabolic" part, and the chest and heart a "rhythmic center".

According to Dan Dugan, Steiner was a champion of the following medical pseudoscientific claims:

supporting vitalism;
doubting germ theory;
weird approach to physiological systems;
"the heart is not a pump".

Reaction to COVID-19
During the COVID-19 pandemic, Steiner hospitals in Germany became notorious amongst legitimate medics for forcing quack remedies on sedated hospital patients, some of whom were critically ill. Remedies used included ginger poultices and homeopathic pellets claimed to contain the dust of shooting stars. Stefan Kluge, director of intensive care medicine at Hamburg's University Medical Centre said the claims of anthroposophic doctors during the pandemic were "highly unprofessional" and that they "risk[ed] causing uncertainty among patients".

Mistletoe treatment for cancer

Rudolf Steiner conjectured that mistletoe could cure cancer, on the basis of the observation that the plant was a parasite which eventually killed its host, a process which he claimed paralleled the progression of cancer. Steiner believed the plant's medical potential was influenced by the position of the sun, moon and planets and that it therefore was important to harvest the plant at the right time. Some mistletoe preparations are ultra-diluted; others are made from fermented mistletoe.  The most commonly used trade names for mistletoe drugs are Iscador and Helixor.

Although laboratory experiments have suggested that mistletoe extract may affect the immune system and be able to kill some kinds of cancer cells, there is little evidence of its benefit to people with cancer. Most of the clinical research claiming that mistletoe therapy is effective is published in Germany, and it is generally considered unreliable because of major lapses in quality. Edzard Ernst wrote that research by anthroposophic doctors often reached positive conclusions on mistletoe therapy because it drew on unreliable material; independent researchers tended instead to find no evidence of benefit. The American Cancer Society says that "available evidence from well-designed clinical trials does not support claims that mistletoe can improve length or quality of life".

Mistletoe-based cancer drugs are widely used in Europe, especially in German-speaking countries. In 2002 nearly half a million prescriptions were paid for by German health insurance and in 2006 there were reportedly around 30 types of mistletoe extract on the market.  Mistletoe extracts have been used as an unconventional treatment for cancer patients in the Netherlands, and in Germany the treatment has been approved as palliative therapy to treat the symptoms of patients with malignant tumors. In Sweden, controversially, mistletoe therapy has been approved for use in the treatment of cancer symptoms.

In other countries mistletoe therapy is virtually unknown. The United States Food and Drug Administration has not approved mistletoe-based drugs for any purpose; mistletoe extracts may not be distributed in or imported into the US except for research purposes.   no mistletoe-based drugs are licensed for use in the United Kingdom.

A 2013 article on mistletoe in Lancet Oncology invoked Ben Goldacre's observation that a geographical preference for certain therapies was a hallmark of quackery, and proposed that the continuing use of this "apparently ineffectual therapy" in a small cluster of countries was based on sociological rather than medical reasons, indicating a need for a more informed consent from patients.

Immunization

The risks arising from using anthroposophical medicine as a substitute for evidence-based medicine are exemplified by several cases of low vaccination levels in Waldorf schools, since some anthroposophical doctors oppose immunization. A 1999 study of children in Sweden showed that in Waldorf schools, only 18% had received MMR vaccination, compared to a level of 93% in other schools nationally.

A 2003 report of a widespread measles outbreak around Coburg, Germany, identified a Waldorf school as the origin. At the time the town's mayor had condemned homeopathic doctors who had discouraged vaccination, saying "Their stronghold is the Waldorf School, which actively encourages people not to have their children vaccinated. Now we have an epidemic."

Paul Offit wrote that Steiner believed vaccination "interferes with karmic development and the cycles of reincarnation", and that adherence to this belief led to a 2008 pertussis outbreak in a Californian Waldorf school, causing its temporary closure.

See also
Alternative cancer treatments
Herbalism
Holistic health

References

Further reading

Books and journal articles

Anthroposophical medicine in

Lectures by Rudolf Steiner
Broken Vessels: The Spiritual Structure of Human Frailty, Michael Lipson (ed.). .
Fundamentals of Anthroposophical Medicine, .
Geographic medicine: The secret of the double. 
The Healing Process: Spirit, Nature & Our Bodies, Catherine E. Creeger (ed.). 
Introducing Anthroposophical Medicine (Foundations of Anthroposophical Medicine, v. 1). 
Medicine: An Introductory Reader, Andrew Maendl (ed.). 
Occult Physiology 
Pastoral Medicine: The Collegial Working of Doctors and Priests.

External links

Medical Section at the Rudolf Steiner Archive, An Online Library
Anthroposophic Medical Library, An Online Resource

Alternative medical systems
Anthroposophic medicine practitioners
Anthroposophy
Pseudoscience